In the 1952 Irish presidential election the outgoing president Seán T. O'Kelly was re-elected without a contest.

Procedure
Under Article 12 of the Constitution of Ireland, candidates could be nominated by:
at least twenty of the 207 serving members of the Houses of the Oireachtas, or
at least four of 31 councils of the administrative counties, including county boroughs, or
themselves, in the case of a former or retiring president.

All Irish citizens on the Dáil electoral register were eligible to vote.

Nomination process
On 25 April 1938, Minister for Local Government made an order under section 6 of the Presidential Elections Act 1937 opening nominations, with noon on 16 May as the deadline for nominations, and 10 June set as the date for a poll (if any).

President Seán T. O'Kelly nominated himself as a candidate, and when no other candidate was nominated, he was declared elected on 16 May. This was the first occasion on which a president nominated themselves for a second term.

Result

O'Kelly was inaugurated for his second term as President of Ireland on 25 June 1952.

References

1952 elections in the Republic of Ireland
Presidential
Presidential elections in Ireland
Uncontested elections
June 1952 events in Europe